The Missouri State Teachers Association Building is a historic building located at Columbia, Missouri. It was built in 1927 and houses the Missouri State Teachers Association Headquarters.  The building is located on South 6th Street on the University of Missouri campus and is a two-story, Tudor Revival style brick building. It was the first building in the United States built specifically to house a state teachers association.  A historical marker on the site commemorates the lands former tenant "Columbia College," the forerunner of the University of Missouri.

It was added to the National Register of Historic Places in 1980.

References

External links
Missouri State Teachers Association

Buildings and structures on the National Register of Historic Places in Missouri
Tudor Revival architecture in Missouri
University and college buildings completed in 1927
Buildings and structures in Columbia, Missouri
University of Missouri
National Register of Historic Places in Boone County, Missouri
1927 establishments in Missouri